Sungai Gadut is a small town in Seremban District, Negeri Sembilan, Malaysia, near Senawang. The place is surrounded by many smaller towns such including Taman Tuanku Jaafar, Bandar Seremban Selatan, Taman Pinggiran Senawang, Taman Senawang Perdana, Ladang Seremban, Kg. Ulu Rantau, and Taman Sri Pertama.

The community contains one primary school and two secondary schools. There are several notable schools located in the city which have existed for more than a decade, such as, SMK Tuanku Jaafar is located Taman Tuanku Jaafar, SJK(T) Ladang Seremban is located In front of Taman Pinggiran Senawang, and Sekolah Dato' Abdul Razak (SDAR) campus is located Ladang Seremban between Jalan Rantau-Sungai Gadut (Negeri Sembilan State Route N5).

Several shopping malls have been opened in Sungai Gadut. One of them is Family Mart only located Taman Tuanku Jaafar.
Nilai Municipal Council has operated their service in Taman Pinggiran Sewanang on early 2019.

The KTM Komuter Seremban Line serves Sungai Gadut at the Sungai Gadut station. The station opened in 2011 when it extended here. The Seremban line eventually extended to Gemas in 2015 along with the ETS service.

Sungai Gadut is part of the DUN Paroi and Parliament Rembau.

References

Towns in Negeri Sembilan